Henry Mosley (1868–1948)  was an Anglican cleric who was  Bishop of Stepney from 1919 to 1928 and Bishop of Southwell from 1928 to 1941.

Early life
Mosley was born at Newcastle-under-Lyme, Staffordshire, the son of Henry Mosley. He was educated at Newcastle-under-Lyme High School and matriculated at Keble College, Oxford on 17 October 1887. He was awarded a BA in 1890 and began his ordained ministry.

Ministry
Mosley began with a curacy at Bethnal Green and held a succession of inner city posts in the east of London. He was with the Trinity Stratford Mission and became Rector of Poplar. He was then at Hackney and Stoke Newington and became Rural Dean. In 1919 he was appointed the suffragan Bishop of Stepney. He was appointed Bishop of Southwell in 1928. He retired in 1941 and served on the Council for the Church and the Countryside from 1943 to 1944.

Mosley died in the Kingsclere district in 1948.

Family

Mosley married Mildred Willis, daughter of Edmund Willis, curate of Horsham, in 1908. Their son Michael was killed in action at the battle of El Alamein and their daughter, Mildred Betty, who married Michael Ridley (vicar of Pimlico and Finchley), became a Church Commissioner.

References

1868 births
Alumni of Keble College, Oxford
Bishops of Stepney
Bishops of Southwell
20th-century Church of England bishops
1948 deaths
People from Newcastle-under-Lyme